Otway Massif is a prominent, mainly ice-free massif, about 10 nautical miles (18 km) long and 7 nautical miles (13 km) wide, standing at the northwest end of the Grosvenor Mountains at the confluence of Mill Glacier and Mill Stream Glacier. Surveyed and named by the Southern Party of the New Zealand Geological Survey Antarctic Expedition (NZGSAE) (1961–62) for P.M. Otway, who had wintered over at Scott Base and was a member of this party and the Northern Party during the summer of 1960–61.

See also
 Mom Peak, in the eastern part of Otway Massif
 Mount Spohn, a prominent peak rising from Otway Massif

External links

Mountains of the Ross Dependency
Dufek Coast